Soap Seoul is a music venue located in Itaewon, South Korea.

Since their launch they established themselves as a Key player in the South Korean Underground Music Scene, inviting Top-Tier local and overseas Dj and artists.

They became the first Club in the world to become an Apple Music Curator.

In 2019 they released their clothing brand and merchandising online store, Soap Seoul Store.

In 2020 they launched a label under the name Soap Records.

Artists with releases on Soap Records
 BRLLNT
 DAUL

References

Music venues in South Korea